Olaf of Denmark – Danish: Oluf - may refer to:

 Olaf I of Denmark
 Olaf II of Denmark